Bhopal–Indore AC Double Decker Express (22185 down / 22186 up) was a Superfast  AC train service, connecting Bhopal to Indore, both within the state of Madhya Pradesh.

Features

It consists of 11 AC coaches. Its all the classes are GPS-enabled and provide information such as current train speed, distance to final destination, distance to next stop, stoppage station name and timing performance on an LCD display. The train started its services in September 2013.

See also
 indiarailinfo.com
 indiarailinfo.com

References

Railway services introduced in 2013
Double-decker trains of India
Transport in Indore
Transport in Bhopal
Rail transport in Madhya Pradesh
Defunct trains in India
Railway services discontinued in 2015